Bossiaea arenicola is a species of flowering plant in the family Fabaceae and is endemic to a far north Queensland. It is a shrub or small tree with broadly elliptic to more or less round leaves, and yellow and pale greenish flowers.

Description

Taxonomy
Bossiaea arenicola was first formally described in 1991 by James Henderson Ross in the journal Muelleria from specimens collected on the track to the McIvor River on Cape York Peninsula. The specific epithet (arenicola) means "sand inhabitant".

Distribution and habitat
This bossiaea grows on sand dunes in heath and shrubland from the tip of Cape York Peninsula to near Cooktown.

References

External links 
 The Australasian Virtual Herbarium – Bossiaea arenicola occurrence data

arenicola
Flora of Queensland
Plants described in 1991